Blaxlands Ridge is a suburb near Richmond, in the state of New South Wales, Australia. It is located in the City of Hawkesbury north of East Kurrajong.

References

Suburbs of Sydney
City of Hawkesbury